Epichorista lindsayi is a species of moth in the family Tortricidae. It is endemic to New Zealand. This species is classified as Nationally Endangered by the Department of Conservation.

Taxonomy
This species was first described by Alfred Philpott in 1928 and named after its collector Stuart Lindsay. Lindsay collected two males of the species at Little River on 29 January 1928. George Vernon Hudson described and illustrated the species in his 1939 publication A supplement to the butterflies and moths of New Zealand. The genus level classification of New Zealand endemic moths within the genus Epichorista is regarded as unsatisfactory and is under revision. As such this species is currently also known as Epichorista (s.l.) lindsayi. The type specimen is held at the Canterbury Museum.

Description

E. lindsayi is very similar in appearance to Eurythecta eremana but can be distinguished by the differences in the venational structure of its wings.

Distribution

This species is endemic to New Zealand. It has only ever been found on the Banks Peninsula.

Habitat
This species occurs in grassy glades dominated by the species Microlaena polynoda in lowland mature podocarp forest.

Biology and life history
This species is a day flying moth.

Host plants
This species is associated with Microlaena polynoda and this plant likely hosts E. lindsayi.

Conservation status
E. lindsayi has been classified under the New Zealand Threat Classification system as being Nationally Endangered.

References

External links

 Image of moth can be found on page 17

Epichorista
Moths described in 1928
Moths of New Zealand
Endemic fauna of New Zealand
Endangered biota of New Zealand
Endemic moths of New Zealand